The Conseil de l'Entente ("Council of Accord" or "Council of Understanding") is a West African regional co-operation forum established in May 1959 by Côte d'Ivoire, Niger, Upper Volta (now Burkina Faso) and Dahomey (now Benin), and joined in 1966 by Togo.

The body grew out of the short-lived Sahel-Benin Union, which was itself created by the four original Council members as a partial successor to the dissolved French regional colonial federation of French West Africa.

Since 1966, the Council has possessed a permanent administrative Secretariat based in Abidjan, the largest city of Côte d'Ivore. A Mutual Aid and Loan Guarantee Fund exists to assist poorer members from a common pool.

See also
Entente
Trade bloc
International organizations

References
.

External links
 http://www.conseildelentente.org

1959 in international relations
Organizations established in 1959
Rassemblement Démocratique Africain
Pan-Africanism in Africa
Pan-Africanism in Burkina Faso
Pan-Africanism in Togo